Cathcart is a town in the Eastern Cape province of South Africa, named after Sir George Cathcart, governor of the  Colony of the Cape of Good Hope 1852–1853.

Establishment
Originally a small military post, established during the Eighth Frontier War, it was established as a village in 1858 when German colonists arrived in the region. Work on its railway connection to East London on the coast was begun by the Cape government of John Molteno in 1876 and the line was officially opened on 3 November 1879.

Religion

St. Alban's Anglican Church, built in 1886 is a well known landmark in Cathcart and has an unusual and distinctive Western façade.

Education
There are a number of high schools and primary schools in Cathcart. Cathcart High School is located North of the town near the N6 route to Queenstown.

Notable people
Allister Sparks

References

External links 

Populated places in the Amahlathi Local Municipality
Populated places established in 1858